Ipatov is a Russian masculine surname originating from the given name Ipaty or its short version Ipat; the feminine counterpart is Ipatova. The surname may refer to
 Alexander Ipatov (born 1993), Ukrainian chess grandmaster
 Dimitry Ipatov (born 1984), Russian ski jumper
 Pavel Ipatov (1914–1994), Soviet economist
 Pavel Ipatov (born 1950), Russian politician
Sergei Ipatov (born 1952), Russian astronomer
 14360 Ipatov, a main-belt asteroid, named after Sergey Ipatov

See also
Lipatov

References

Russian-language surnames